Hector-Henri Malot (Hector Malot) (20 May 1830 – 18 July 1907) was a French writer born in La Bouille, Seine-Maritime. He studied law in Rouen and Paris, but eventually literature became his passion. He worked as a dramatic critic for Lloyd Francais and as a literary critic for L'Opinion Nationale.

His first book, published in 1859, was Les Amants. In total Malot wrote over 70 books. By far his most famous book is Sans Famille (Nobody's Boy, 1878), which deals with the travels of the young orphan Remi, who is sold to the street musician Vitalis at age 8. Sans Famille gained fame as a children's book, though it was not originally intended as such.

He announced his retirement as an author of fiction in 1895, but in 1896 he returned with the novel L'amour Dominateur as well as the account of his literary life Le Roman de mes Romans (The Novel of my Novels).

He died in Fontenay-sous-Bois in 1907.

Works by Malot
 Victimes d'Amour (a trilogy)
 Les Amants (1859)

Legacy
Three anime series have been made based on Malot's works:
Nobody's Boy: Remi (1977, 51 episodes, based on Sans Famille)
The Story of Perrine (1978, 53 episodes, based on En Famille)
Remi, Nobody's Girl (1996, 26 episodes, based on Sans Famille with gender swap)

External links

 
 
 

 
1830 births
1907 deaths
19th-century French novelists
People from Seine-Maritime